The Birri Gubba people, formerly known as Biria, are an Aboriginal Australian people of the state of Queensland.

Language

The Birri Gubba people spoke a number of languages in the Biri language group.

Country
On its eastern flank was the Clarke Range, while its western borders reached the Leichhardt Range. To the south, its territory extended down to Netherdale.

Alternative names

Alternative names for the Biria people include Biriaba, Birigaba, Breeaba, Perembba, Perenbba, and Birri Gubba.

European contact
In 1846, after their ship Peruvian was wrecked, a group of British crew members made it to shore on Birri Gubba land, and were helped to survive by Birri Gubba people. The castaways stayed with various groups for some time, with one, James Morrill, living among the Aboriginal people for around 17 years. His memoir, Sketch of a Residence Among the Aboriginals of Northern Queensland for Seventeen Years  tells of his efforts to leave his group of Birra Gubba people on their land, and to encourage harmonious living between the two groups. Today he is seen as an early pioneer of Indigenous land rights in Australia.

A forthcoming (2022) film, The Wild One starring Matt Oxley, John Jarratt and Marlena Law, is based on the story of Morrill and the people who took him in, directed by Australian filmmaker Nathan Colquhoun.

Notable Biri people

Cathy Freeman, Olympic-level athlete
Jackie Huggins, activist and academic
Boori Pryor, formerly the joint inaugural Australian Children's Laureate and storyteller
 Gracelyn Smallwood , midwife, academic, NAIDOC Person of the Year in 2014
Samuel Wagan Watson, award-winning poet, narrator, and storyteller
Sam Watson, activist, writer, lecturer, and storyteller

Notes

Citations

Sources

Aboriginal peoples of Queensland